The 1981–82 Midland Football League was the 82nd and the last in the history of the Midland Football League, a football competition in England.

At the end of the season the league merged with Yorkshire Football League and formed new Northern Counties East Football League. Most of the Midland League clubs were transferred to the Northern Counties East League divisions.

Premier Division

The Premier Division featured 17 clubs which competed in the previous season, along with one new club:
Shepshed Charterhouse, joined from the Leicestershire Senior League

League table

Division One

Division One featured 14 clubs which competed in the previous season, along with two new clubs:
Graham Street Prims, joined from the East Midlands Regional League
Kimberley Town, relegated from the Premier Division

League table

References

Midland Football League (1889)
8